Brighton was a parliamentary constituency of the House of Commons of the Parliament of the United Kingdom from 1832 until it was divided into single-member seats from the 1950 United Kingdom general election. Covering the seaside towns of Brighton and Hove in East Sussex, it elected two Members of Parliament (MP) by the block vote system of election.

History

The constituency was created by the Reform Act 1832 for the 1832 general election. The constituency was based on the south coast seaside resort town of Brighton.

When it was proposed to enfranchise Brighton a Tory observed in Parliament that it would represent merely "toffy (sic), lemonade and jelly shops". Charles Seymour suggests he "obviously feared the Whig proclivities of the numerous tradespeople established there".

The first representatives of the constituency were of radical opinions. Isaac Newton Wigney (MP 1832–1839 and 1841–1842) was described as being of "Whig opinions inclining to radicalism, in favour of the ballot, and pledged himself to resign his seat whenever his constituents called upon him so to do". His colleague, the Nonconformist preacher and attorney George Faithfull (MP 1832–1835), went much further. He advocated "the immediate abolition of slavery, of all unmerited pensions and sinecures, the standing army, all useless expense, the Corn Laws, and every other monopoly. He said that if the extent of suffrage at that time was not found efficient he would vote for universal suffrage: and if triennial Parliaments did not succeed, would vote for having them annually; he was an advocate of the ballot".

Seymour provides figures for the voting qualification of Brighton electors, following the Reform Act 1867. The town was one of six boroughs in England where the £10 occupiers, enfranchised in 1832, were much more numerous than the householders who received the vote under the 1867 Act. There were 7,590 £10 occupiers and only 944 householders on the electoral register.

Members of Parliament for the constituency, after the first two, were of more conventional views; but most elections were won by the Liberal Party until 1884. In 1884 the Liberal MP, William Marriott, broke with his party as he disagreed with Prime Minister Gladstone's foreign and Egyptian policy. Marriott resigned his seat and was re-elected as a Conservative. From that time onwards the Liberal Party never won an election in the constituency, except for a by-election in 1905 and both seats in the landslide victory of 1906. Apart from those few years of liberal strength, Brighton became a safe Conservative constituency.

The 1931 election of Sir Cooper Rawson holds the record for the largest majority ever received at a general election (62,253), as well as the most votes received by an individual (75,205).

Boundaries 

The constituency was defined in the Parliamentary Boundaries Act 1832 as comprising the "respective Parishes of Brighthelmstone and Hove". The act named the parliamentary borough as "Brighthelmstone", but the name "Brighton" was invariably used.

The two parishes were adjacent coastal resorts in the historic county of Sussex in South East England. Brighton obtained a charter of incorporation to become a municipal borough in 1854, while Hove formed a local board of health in 1858, becoming a borough forty years later. These changes in local government made no changes to the boundaries of the constituency. Under the Representation of the People Act 1867 the constituency was enlarged to include the Preston area which fell inside Brighton's municipal boundaries.

These boundaries were used until the 1918 general election when seats were redefined in terms of the local government areas then in existence. The parliamentary borough was defined as consisting of the County Borough of Brighton and the Municipal Borough of Hove. The constituency was enlarged to include Aldrington which lay with Hove's borough boundaries.

Under the Representation of the People Act 1948 the remaining multi-member constituencies were abolished and replaced with single-member ones from the 1950 election. The County Borough of Brighton was divided into Brighton Kemptown and Brighton Pavilion. The Municipal Borough of Hove, which had also been included in the old Brighton seat was combined with Portslade by Sea Urban District to form the new Hove constituency.

Members of Parliament 

Notes:-
 1 Marriott resigned his seat as a Liberal MP in February 1884, because of dissatisfaction with the foreign and Egyptian policy of the Liberal government. He was re-elected in March 1884 as a Conservative candidate.
 2 Lord Erskine was a courtesy title. He was the heir apparent of The 12th Earl of Mar and 14th Earl of Kellie, but as he died before his father he never inherited the hereditary titles of his family.

Elections

Elections in the 1940s

Elections in the 1930s

Elections in the 1920s

Elections in the 1910s

Elections in the 1900s

Elections in the 1890s

Elections in the 1880s

 

 Caused by Marriott's appointment as Judge Advocate General of the Armed Forces.

 

 Caused by Marriott's decision to seek re-election as a Conservative.

Elections in the 1870s

Elections in the 1860s

 
 
 
 
 

 
 
 

 
 

 

 Caused by Coningham's resignation.

 
 

 

 Caused by Pechell's death.

Elections in the 1850s

 
 
 

 
 

 

 

 

 Caused by Hervey's appointment as a Lord Commissioner of the Treasury

Elections in the 1840s

 

 Caused by Wigney's resignation by accepting the office of Steward of the Chiltern Hundreds after he was declared bankrupt

Elections in the 1830s

See also
List of former United Kingdom Parliament constituencies

Notes

References

Further reading
 Boundaries of Parliamentary Constituencies 1885–1972, compiled and edited by F.W.S. Craig (Parliamentary Reference Publications 1972)
 British Parliamentary Election Results 1832–1885, compiled and edited by F.W.S. Craig (Macmillan Press 1977)
 British Parliamentary Election Results 1885–1918, compiled and edited by F.W.S. Craig (Macmillan Press 1974)
 British Parliamentary Election Results 1918–1949, compiled and edited by F.W.S. Craig (Macmillan Press, revised edition 1977)

Parliamentary constituencies in South East England (historic)
Constituencies of the Parliament of the United Kingdom established in 1832
Constituencies of the Parliament of the United Kingdom disestablished in 1950
Politics of East Sussex
Politics of Brighton and Hove